Endressia is a genus of flowering plants belonging to the family Apiaceae.

Its native range is eastern Pyrenees in France, to northern Spain.

Known species:
Endressia castellana 
Endressia pyrenaica 

The genus name of Endressia is in honour of Philipp Anton Christoph Endress (1806–1831), a German botanist and plant collector, and it was published in Ann. Sci. Nat. (published in Paris) Vol.26 on page 223 in 1832.

References

Apioideae
Plants described in 1832
Garden plants
Flora of France
Flora of Spain
Apioideae genera